The following is a list of important scholarly resources related to James Monroe, the fifth president of the United States.  for a comprehensive older guide see Harry Ammon, James Monroe: A Bibliography (Greenwood, 1990).

Secondary sources

  706 pp. standard scholarly biography
 Ammon, Harry. "James Monroe" in Henry F. Graff ed., The Presidents: A Reference History (3rd ed. 2002) online
 
 Cresson, William P. James Monroe (1946). 577 pp. good scholarly biography
 Cunningham, Noble E., Jr. The Presidency of James Monroe. 1996. 246 pp. standard scholarly survey
 Dangerfield, George. Era of Good Feelings (1953) excerpt and text search
 
 Elkins, Stanley M. and Eric McKitrick. The Age of Federalism (1995). most advanced analysis of the politics of the 1790s. online edition
 Heidler, David S. "The Politics of National Aggression: Congress and the First Seminole War," Journal of the Early Republic 1993 13(4): 501–530. in JSTOR
 Finkelman, Paul, ed. Encyclopedia of the New American Nation, 1754–1829 (2005), 1600 pp.
  superficial, short, popular biography
 Haworth, Peter Daniel. "James Madison and James Monroe Historiography: A Tale of Two Divergent Bodies of Scholarship." in A Companion to James Madison and James Monroe (2013): 521-539.
  Pulitzer Prize; a sweeping interpretation of the era
 Holmes, David L. The Faiths of the Founding Fathers, May 2006, online version
 
 Kranish, Michael. "At Capitol, slavery's story turns full circle", The Boston Globe, Boston, December 28, 2008.
 Leibiger, Stuart, ed. A Companion to James Madison and James Monroe (2012) excerpt; emphasis on historiography
 McGrath, Tim. James Monroe: A Life (Dutton, 2020) 736pp0
 McManus, Michael J. “President James Monroe’s Domestic Policies, 1817–1825: ‘To Advance the Best Interests of Our Union,’” in  A Companion to James Madison and James Monroe, ed. Stuart Leibiger (2013), 438–55.
 May, Ernest R. The Making of the Monroe Doctrine (1975), argues it was issued to influence the outcome of the presidential election of 1824.
 Perkins, Bradford. Castlereagh and Adams: England and the United States, 1812–1823 (1964)
 Perkins, Dexter. The Monroe Doctrine, 1823–1826 (1927), the standard monograph about the origins of the doctrine.
 Poston, Brook. "'Bolder Attitude': James Monroe, the French Revolution, and the Making of the Monroe Doctrine." Virginia Magazine of History and Biography 124.4 (2016): 282.
 Poston, Brook. James Monroe: A Republican Champion (University Press of Florida; 2019)  excerpt
 Powell, Walter & Steinberg, Richard. The nonprofit sector: a research handbook, Yale, 2006, p. 40.
 
 Renehan Edward J., Jr. The Monroe Doctrine: The Cornerstone of American Foreign Policy (2007)
 Scherr, Arthur. "James Monroe and John Adams: An Unlikely 'Friendship'". The Historian 67#3 (2005) pp 405+. online edition
 Skeen, Carl Edward. 1816: America Rising (1993) popular history
 Scherr, Arthur. "James Monroe on the Presidency and 'Foreign Influence: from the Virginia Ratifying Convention (1788) to Jefferson's Election (1801)." Mid-America 2002 84(1–3): 145–206. .
 Scherr, Arthur. "Governor James Monroe and the Southampton Slave Resistance of 1799." Historian 1999 61(3): 557–578.  Fulltext online in SwetsWise and Ebsco.
 Styron, Arthur. The Last of the Cocked Hats: James Monroe and the Virginia Dynasty (1945). 480 pp. thorough, scholarly treatment of the man and his times.
  a new biography.
 
 White, Leonard D. The Jeffersonians: A Study in Administrative History, 1801–1829 (1951), explains the operation and organization of federal administration
 Whitaker, Arthur P. The United States and the Independence of Latin America (1941)
 Wilmerding, Jr., Lucius, James Monroe: Public Claimant (1960) A study regarding Monroe's attempts to get reimbursement for personal expenses and losses from his years in public service after his presidency ended.
 
 Wood, Gordon S. Empire of Liberty: A History of the Early Republic, 1789–1815 (2009)

Primary sources

 Brown, Stuart Gerry, ed. The Autobiography of James Monroe (Syracuse Up, 2017); fragments of Monroe's unfinished autobiography,
 Preston, Daniel, ed. The Papers of James Monroe: Selected Correspondence and Papers (6 vol, 2006 to 2017), the major scholarly edition; in progress, with coverage to 1814.
 Monroe, James. The Political Writings of James Monroe. ed. by James P. Lucier, (2002). 863 pp.
 Writings of James Monroe, edited by Stanislaus Murray Hamilton, ed., 7 vols. (1898–1903) online edition at Google Books
 Richardson, James D. ed. A Compilation of the Messages and Papers of the Presidents (1897), reprints his major messages and reports.

For children
 Venezia,  Mike. James Monroe: Fifth President, 1817-1825  (Getting to Know the US Presidents) (2005)

Monroe, James
Monroe, James
Monroe, James
Monroe, James
Monroe, James